The Yokohama Maru was a 6,143-gross register ton passenger and cargo vessel built by Mitsubishi Dockyard & Engine Works, Nagaski for Nippon Yusen Kabushiki Kaisha and launched in 1912. The ship was used on the Guam to Japan route. She was requisitioned by the Imperial Japanese Army and fitted out as a troop transport.

Invasion of Guam
On 8 December 1941, she was assigned to Operation "G", the invasion of Guam as one of 10 transports carrying Major General Horii Tomitaro's 55th Infantry Corps. The naval operation was headed by the 4th Fleet operating out of Saipan consisting of minelayer Tsugaru as flagship; seaplane tender Kiyokawa Maru; 4 cruisers, Aoba, Furutaka, Kako, Kinugasa (Cruiser Division 6, detached from 1st Fleet); and 4 destroyers, Oboro (detached from Carrier Division 5 of the IJN 1st Air Fleet), and Kikuzuki, Uzuki, and Yūzuki (Destroyer Division 23, detached from Carrier Division 2, IJN 1st Air Fleet). The remaining ships all belonged to the Fifth Base Force, 4th Fleet consisting of Gunboat Division 7 (Hirotama Maru, Shotoku Maru), Subchaser Division 59 (subchasers Shonan Maru No. 5, Shonan Maru No. 6; netlayer Shofuku Maru), Subchaser Division 60 (subchasers Kyo Maru No. 8, Kyo Maru No. 10; netlayer Shuko Maru), and Minesweeper Division 15 (Fumi Maru No. 2, Seki Maru No. 3).

Invasion of Salamaua–Lae
She was the first ever victim of American aerial torpedo Mk. 13

Notes

External links
Chronological List of Japanese Merchant Vessel Losses

1912 ships
Auxiliary ships of the Imperial Japanese Navy
Ships sunk by US aircraft
Shipwrecks of Papua New Guinea
Maritime incidents in March 1942